Two ships in the United States Navy have been named USS Roe for Francis Asbury Roe.

  was a modified  launched in 1909 and served in World War I. She served in the United States Coast Guard from 1924 to 1930. She was sold in 1934.
  was a  launched in 1939 and decommissioned in 1945 after serving in World War II.

United States Navy ship names